Sergina is a rural locality (a village) in Stepanovskoye Rural Settlement, Kudymkarsky District, Perm Krai, Russia. The population was 14 as of 2010. There are 2 streets.

Geography 
Sergina is located 9 km southwest of Kudymkar (the district's administrative centre) by road. Pochkina is the nearest rural locality.

References 

Rural localities in Kudymkarsky District